Der Faust, officially Deutscher Theaterpreis Der Faust, is a German theatre prize, a national prize from 2006. It is awarded annually by the organizations Deutscher Bühnenverein, Deutsche Akademie der Darstellenden Künste and the state in which the award ceremony is held. The trophy was designed by the Austrian stage designer Erich Wonder.

A jury of mostly members of the Bühnenverein considers proposals from theatres which may not name their own productions. The Jury selects three nominations per category, from which members of the Deutschen Akademie der Darstellenden Künste elect the winners. The prize is awarded in eight categories:

 Regie Schauspiel (direction play)
 Darstellerin/Darsteller Schauspiel (performer play)
 Regie Musiktheater (direction opera)
 Sängerdarstellerin/Sängerdarsteller Musiktheater (performer opera)
 Choreografie (choreography)
 Darstellerin/Darsteller Tanz (dancer)
 Regie Kinder- und Jugendtheater (direction children's and youth theatre)
 Bühne/Kostüm (stage / costumes)

Additional optional awards are a prize for a life's work (Lebenswerk) and Preis der Präsidentin (prize of the [female] president).

Award ceremonies 
The award ceremonies have taken place at alternating locations, presented by notable actors:
  in Essen, Nordrhein-Westfalen, moderation: Rufus Beck
 Evelyn Herlitzius (performer opera)
 Meg Stuart (choreography)
  in Munich, Bavaria, moderation: Peter Jordan and 
 Angela Denoke (performer opera)
  in Stuttgart, Baden-Württemberg, moderation:  and Bernd Moss
 Christof Loy (direction opera)
 Iris Vermillion (performer opera)
 William Forsythe (choreography)
  in Mainz, Rheinland-Pfalz, moderation:  and 
 Barrie Kosky (direction opera)
 Michael Volle (performer opera)
  in Essen, moderation: Samuel Finzi and 
 Claus Guth (direction opera)
 Sophie Rois (performer play)
 Eva-Maria Westbroek (performer opera)
  in Frankfurt, Hesse, moderation: 
 Martin Wuttke (performer play)
 Claudia Barainsky (performer opera)
 Neco Celik (direction children's and youth theatre)
  in Erfurt, Thuringia, moderation: Dominique Horwitz
 Martin Kušej (direction opera)
  in Berlin, moderation: Peter Jordan
 Claus Guth (direction opera)
 Christian Gerhaher (performer opera)
 Bridget Breiner (choreography)
  in Hamburg, moderation: Ulrich Matthes
 Evelyn Herlitzius (performer opera)
 Aleksandar Denić (stage)
  in Saarbrücken, moderation: Bernd Moss
 Ulrich Matthes (performer drama)
 Andrea Breth (direction opera)
 Barbara Hannigan (performer opera)
 Bridget Breiner (choreography)
  in Freiburg, moderation: Milan Peschel
 Frank Castorf (direction drama)
 Peter Konwitschny (direction opera)
 Nicole Chevalier (performer opera)
  in Leipzig, moderation: Christian Friedel
 Christoph Marthaler (direction opera)
  in Regensburg, Bavaria, moderation: 
 Tobias Kratzer (direction opera)
  in Kassel, Hesse, moderation: Wiebke Puls
 Johannes Martin Kränzle (performer opera)
 Anne Teresa De Keersmaeker (choreography)
  in Düsseldorf, moderation: André Kaczmarczyk
 Marlis Petersen (performer opera)

Lifetime achievement
 2006: George Tabori
 2007: Michael Gielen
 2008: 
 2009: Pina Bausch (posthumous)
 2010: 
 2011: 
 2012: Tankred Dorst, 
 2013: Inge Keller
 2014: 
 2015: Franz Mazura
 2016: Hans Neuenfels
 2017: Elfriede Jelinek
 2018: Aribert Reimann
 2019: 
 2020: William Forsythe
 2021: Nicole Heesters
 2022: Achim Freyer

References

External links 
 

German theatre awards
Awards established in 2006
2006 establishments in Germany